Jolita Herlyn (born Jolita Kraniauskaitė; 14 September 1966, in Vilnius) is a Lithuanian novelist.

Biography 
In 1990, she graduated from Moscow Lomonosov university, having studied philosophy.

1990-1997 - Taught Philosophy and Logic at Klaipeda university.

1997-2005 - Worked in municipality of Klaipeda, department of foreign affairs. At the same time wrote multiple articles for local newspapers "Klaipėda" and "Vakarų Ekspresas".

2004-2005 - led a live TV show "Proto Aistros" on local television "Balticum Tv".

2006-2009 - Worked in DnB Nord in Copenhagen as a manager of marketing department.

2010 - Moved to Hamburg, Germany with her family and started writing novels.

Bibliography 
 Trys mano vieninteliai: novel. - Vilnius: Alma littera, 2013. - 288p. - 
 Mano vyrai ir jų žmonos: novel. - Vilnius: Alma littera, 2014. - 264p. - 
 Svaigulys: novel. - Vilnius: Alma littera, 2015. - 240p. - 
 Atsargiai - moteris!: novel. - Vilnius: Alma littera, 2016. - 296p. - 
 Geismo spąstuose: novel. - Vilnius: Alma littera, 2016. - 
 Angelai neverkia: novel. – Vilnius: Alma littera, 2017. – 
 Veidu į saulę: novel – Vilnius : Alma littera, 2018. – 
 Žinau, kad nieko nežinau: novel - Vilnius :Alma littera, 2019 - 
 Šešėlių gaudytoja - Vilnius: Alma littera, 2020 - 
 Moterų sodas - Vilnius: Alma littera, 2021 - 
 Gėdos vaikas - Vilnius: Alma littera, 2022 -

References

External links
Alma littera, Lithuanian authors

1966 births
Living people
Lithuanian novelists
Moscow State University alumni
Academic staff of Klaipėda University